The Ambassador of the United Kingdom to Japan is the United Kingdom's foremost diplomatic representative in Japan, and is the head of the UK's diplomatic mission there.

The following is a chronological list of British heads of mission (ministers and ambassadors) in Japan from 1859. Before 1905, there were no ambassadors exchanged between the two countries, the highest rank being envoy extraordinary and minister plenipotentiarya rank just below ambassador. Before 1859, there was no treaty and no diplomatic relations, because Japan was isolated from the world by the Tokugawa shogunate's policy of national isolation called sakoku (literally locked country).

List of heads of mission

Envoys Extraordinary and Ministers Plenipotentiary

Ambassadors 

No representation (1941–1946, due to World War II)

Political Representative 
 Sir Alvary Gascoigne (1946–1951) 
 Sir Esler Dening (1951–1952)

Ambassadors

See also
 British Embassy, Tokyo
 Embassy of Japan, London
 Japan–United Kingdom relations
 Anglo-Japanese Friendship Treaty
 Anglo-Japanese Treaty of Amity and Commerce
 Anglo-Japanese Alliance
 Treaty of San Francisco
 Foreign and Commonwealth Office
 Foreign relations of the United Kingdom

Notes

References
 Hoare, James. (1999). Embassies in the East: the Story of the British Embassies in Japan, China, and Korea from 1859 to the Present.  Richmond, Surrey: Curzon Press. ;  OCLC 42645589
 Ian Nish. (2004). British Envoys in Japan 1859-1972. Folkestone, Kent: Global Oriental. ;  OCLC 249167170
 Nussbaum, Louis Frédéric and Käthe Roth. (2005). Japan Encyclopedia. Cambridge: Harvard University Press. ; OCLC 48943301

External links

Japan
United Kingdom